Bon-Adrien Jeannot de Moncey (or Jannot de Moncey), 1st Duke of Conegliano (31 July 1754 – 20 April 1842) was a French military officer and a prominent commander in the French Revolutionary Wars and later a Marshal of the Empire during the Napoleonic Wars. He later became governor of the Hôtel des Invalides. MONCEY is one of the names inscribed under the Arc de Triomphe, on Column 33.

Biography

Moncey was born on 31 July 1754 in Palise or Moncey, Doubs. His father was a lawyer from Besançon. During his childhood, he twice enlisted in the French Army, but his father procured his discharge on both occasions. His desire was at last gratified in 1778, when he received a commission.

Revolutionary and Napoleonic wars
Moncey was a captain when, in 1791, he embraced the principles of the French Revolution. He won great distinction in the campaigns of 1793 and 1794 during the War of the Pyrenees, rising from the commander of a battalion to the commander-in-chief of the Army of the Western Pyrenees in a few months, and his successful operations were instrumental in compelling the Spanish government to make peace. After this, he was employed in the highest commands until 1799, when the government, suspecting him of being a royalist, dismissed him.

The coup d'état of 18 Brumaire in 1799 brought Moncey back to the active list, and during Napoleon's Italian campaign of 1800, he led a corps from Switzerland into Italy, surmounting all the difficulties of bringing horses and guns over the then formidable Gotthard Pass. In 1801, Napoleon made him inspector-general of the French Gendarmerie, and on the assumption of the imperial title, made him a Marshal of the Empire. In 1805, Moncey received the Grand Cordon of the Legion of Honour.

In July 1808, Moncey was made Duke of Conegliano; it was a duché grand-fief, a rare hereditary honor. The title was later confirmed under the Bourbon Restoration, and, since he had no surviving son, Moncey was granted permission to pass it to his son-in-law (with his newly granted title of Baron of Conegliano and Peer of France).

The same year, the first of the Peninsular War, Moncey was sent to Spain in command of an army corps. He distinguished himself by his victorious advance on Valencia, but the effect of that was destroyed by General Pierre Dupont's defeat at the Battle of Bailén. Moncey then took a leading part in the emperor's campaign on the Ebro and in the Second Siege of Saragossa in 1809.

He refused to serve in the invasion of Russia, and therefore had no share in the campaign of the Grande Armée in 1812 and 1813. However, when France was invaded in 1814, Moncey reappeared in the field and fought the last battle for Paris on the heights of Montmartre and at the barrier of Clichy.

In 1814, he supported Louis XVIII and was made a Peer of France as Baron of Conegliano (confirmed in 1825). He remained neutral during Napoleon's return to power, feeling himself bound to Louis XVIII by his engagements as a Peer of France, but after Waterloo he was punished for refusing to take part in the court martial of Marshal Michel Ney by imprisonment and the loss of his marshalate and peerage.

Bourbon Restoration
In 1816, Moncey was given back his title of marshal by the king and he re-entered the Chamber of Peers three years later. He continued his military career as his last active service was as commander of an army corps in the short war with Spain in 1823. From 1833 to 1842, Moncey became governor of the prestigious Hôtel des Invalides (a home for veterans in Paris). Present at the return of Napoleon's remains in December 1840, he said after the ceremony, "Now, let's go home to die".

Family
Moncey married Charlotte Prospère Remillet (1761–1842), by whom he had 3 children:
Anne-Francoise (1791–1842), married to Louis-Charles Bourlon de Chevigné, who was permitted by the King to add "de Moncey" to his surname in 1819.
Bon-Louis (1792–1817)
Jeanne-Francoise (1807–1853), married Alphonse-Auguste Duchesne de Gillevoisin de Conegliano (1798–1878), 2nd Baron de Gillevoisin and later 2nd Duke of Conegliano and 2nd Baron of Conegliano, who inherited his father-in-law's titles.

References

1754 births
1842 deaths
Dukes of Conegliano
French politicians
French Republican military leaders of the French Revolutionary Wars
Marshals of France
Marshals of the First French Empire
Names inscribed under the Arc de Triomphe
Peers of France
People from Doubs